Charles Lee Lynch (July 10, 1901 – June 15, 1951) was an American newspaper editor and politician.

Born in Charleston, Illinois, Lynch lived in Charleston, Illinois for most of his life and was a newspaper reporter and the city editor for the Charleston Daily News and was also a radio news editor and harness race official. Lynch served on the Charleston Zoning Commission and was the city tax collector. Lynch was elected to the Illinois House of Representatives as a Democrat. Lee died of a heart attack on June 15, 1951, which he had suffered the previous day, on June 14, 1951, in Springfield, Illinois while the Illinois House of Representatives was in session.

Notes

External links

News Reporters: A Tradition of Central Illinois Arthur Lee & Lee Lynch-The Beginning-1937

1901 births
1951 deaths
People from Charleston, Illinois
Editors of Illinois newspapers
Democratic Party members of the Illinois House of Representatives
20th-century American politicians
Journalists from Illinois
20th-century American journalists
American male journalists